Mykhailo Zakharovych Zghurovskyi, also spelled as Mykhailo Zgurovsky,, Minister of Education and Science of Ukraine (in office 1994-1999). Today he is a rector of the National Technical University of Ukraine "Igor Sikorsky Kyiv Polytechnic Institute".

He is also a Doctor of Technical Sciences, Professor, Academician of the National Academy of Sciences of Ukraine, National Academy of Pedagogical Sciences of Ukraine, Presidium member of the National Academy of Sciences of Ukraine, foreign member of the Russian Academy of Sciences (On 8 April 2022 announced withdrawal from the foreign Academy members), corresponding Member of the Division of Mathematics and the Natural Sciences in the Austrian Academy of Sciences. He is also a renowned scientist and specialist in the field of cybernetics, systems analysis, big data mining and decision theory.
He is a Scientific Supervisor of the Institute for Applied System Analysis (part of both Ministry of Education and Science of Ukraine and National Academy of Sciences of Ukraine), former Ukrainian education minister.

He generalized the main provisions of the theory of system analysis, laid the foundations of system mathematics, proposed a new approach to the theory of extremal problems for nonlinear operator, differential-operator equations and inclusions, variational inequalities. The most famous applications of his scientific research results relate to the field of mathematical geophysics, geoinformatics, socio-economic problems of modern society.

Biography
Mykhailo Zghurovskyi was born in 1950, January 30 in Skala-Podilska, Ternopil region, Ukrainian SSR. vIn 1975, he graduated from the Kyiv Polytechnic Institute, faculty of control systems, with a specialty in "Automated control systems". His PhD thesis was titled "Optimal discrete control of one class of distributed processes of unsteady heat transfer" (1979). His Doctoral thesis was titled "Computer-aided design and optimal control of non-stationary processes and fields under data uncertainty" (1984).

From March 1975 to August 1986 he was a engineer, senior engineer, senior researcher, and professor of the Department of Technical Cybernetics at the Kyiv Polytechnic Institute. From May 1986 to August 1987 he was the Deputy Head of the Research Department of the Ministry of Higher and Secondary Specialized Education of the Ukrainian SSR.

From August 1987 to March 1988 he was again a Professor of the Department of Technical Cybernetics at the Kyiv Polytechnic Institute. From March 1988 to April 1992 he was Vice-Rector for Academic Affairs of the Kyiv Polytechnic Institute. Since April 1992 he has been Rector of the Kyiv Polytechnic Institute (since 2016 - National Technical University of Ukraine "Igor Sikorsky Kyiv Polytechnic Institute").

He was Minister of Education and Science of Ukraine from November 1994 to January 1999.

From 1996 to 2015 he was Director (since 2015 - the Scientific Supervisor) of the Institute of Applied Systems Analysis of the Ministry of Education and Science of Ukraine and the National Academy of Sciences of Ukraine (based on NTUU "Igor Sikorsky Kyiv Polytechnic Institute").

In 2006 Zghurovskyi was the founder of the operation in Ukraine of non-governmental organization (WDS-Ukraine), which is a full member of the World Data System (WDS) of the International Science Council (ISC). The Center (WDS-Ukraine) specializes in interdisciplinary researches of complex systems of various nature.

The scientific school of Zghurovskyi prepared and trained 14 doctors and more than 50 candidates of sciences.  He is the author of 52 inventions, the author and co-author of more than 820 scientific papers, 43 monographs and textbooks published in Germany, USA, Switzerland, Poland, Japan, China, Ukraine and other countries of the world.

Public service
Since March 1995 - Deputy Head of the Commission on Higher Education Reform in Ukraine.

Since August 1995 - Member of the State Commission on the Science Reorganization field.

From October 1995 to January 1999 - Chairman of the State Accreditation Commission of Ukraine.

From February 1997 to January 1999 - Member of the Council on Language Policy under the President of Ukraine.

From 18 January 2018 to 9 July 2019 - member (from 23 January 2018 - Chairman) of the Supervisory Board of the State Concern "Ukroboronprom".

Membership in foreign/international scientific communities
National Representative of the Scientific Committee of the World Data System - WDS (Paris, France).

Member of the Board of the Earth Data Network for Education and Scientific Exchange - EDNES (Strasbourg, France).

National Representative to the International Science Council - ISC (Paris, France).

National Representative of the Committee on Data for Science and Technology - CODATA (Paris, France).

Member of the UNESCO Governing Committee on the Education for Sustainable Development Program.

President of the Network of the Black Sea Universities Network  - BSUN (Constance, Romania) 2008-2010.

Awards and medals
 Honored Worker of Science and Technology of Ukraine (2000)
 Three times laureate of the State Prize of Ukraine in Science and Technology (1990, 1999, 2005)
 Laureate of the V.M. Glushkov award of National Academy of Sciences of Ukraine (1999)
 Laureate of the V.S. Mikhalevich award of National Academy of Sciences of Ukraine (2004)
 Laureate of the S.A. Lebedev award of National Academy of Sciences of Ukraine (2020)
 Awarded with the state awards and prizes of Ukraine (full holder of the Order of Merit), Vietnam, Italy, Estonia, China, Poland, France, Japan
 Awarded with "Złota Odznaka Honorowa", Poland (1995)
 Awarded with "Academician M.A. Sadovsky" medal, Russian academy of sciences (2006)
 Awarded with the special sign of academician, Russian academy of sciences (2008)
 Awarded with the "Zasłużony dla Politechniki Poznańskiej" medal ("For the services to Poznan University of Technology"), Poland (2018)
 He has the title of "Doctor Honoris Causa" of more than 15 universities in Ukraine, Belarus, Poland, and Russia.

Selected publications
 Zgurovsky M.Z., Mel’nik V.S. Nonlinear Analysis and Control of Physical Processes and Fields. Springer-Verlag Berlin Heidelberg, 2004.- 508 p.
 Zgurovsky M.Z. General pattern of global system conflicts and global threats of the 21st century, Cybern. and Syst. Analysis, 43, No.5,687–695(2007)
 Zgurovsky M.Z., Pankratova N.D. System Analysis: Theory and Applications. Springer-Verlag Berlin Heidelberg, 2007.- 447 p.
 Zgurovsky M. Z. Interrelation between Kondratieff cycles and global systemic conflicts. Cybern. and Syst. Analysis. 45, No.5, 742–749 (2009)
 Zgurovsky M.Z. Metric aspects of periodic processes in economy and society. Cybern. and Syst. Analysis. 46, No.2, 167–172 (2010)
 Zgurovsky M.Z., Mel’nik V.S., Kasyanov P.O. Evolution Inclusions and Variation Inequalities for Ears Data Processing I. Springer-Verlag Berlin Heidelberg, 2011.- 247 p.
 Zgurovsky M.Z., Mel’nik V.S., Kasyanov P.O. Evolution Inclusions and Variation Inequalities for Ears Data Processing II. Springer-Verlag Berlin Heidelberg,2011.- 274 p.
 Zgurovsky M.Z., Kasyanov P.O., Kapustyan O.V., Valero J., Zadoianchuk N.V. Evolution Inclusions and Variation Inequalities for Ears Data Processing III. Springer- Verlag Berlin Heidelberg, 2012.- 330 p.
 Zgurovsky M.Z., Sadovnichiy V.A. Continuous and Distributed Systems. Theory and Applications. Springer International Publishing Switzerland, 2014. – 333 p.
 Sadovnichiy V.A., Zgurovsky M.Z. Continuous and Distributed Systems II. Theory and Applications. Springer International Publishing Switzerland, 2015. – 387 p.
 Zgurovsky M.Z., Zaychenko Y.P. The Fundamentals of Computational Intelligence: System Approach. Springer International Publishing Switzerland, 2016. – 375 p.
 Sadovnichiy V.A., Zgurovsky M.Z. Advances in Dynamical Systems and Control. Springer International Publishing Switzerland, 2016. – 471 p.
 Zgurovsky M.Z., Kasyanov. P.O. Qualitative and Quantitative Analysis of Nonlinear Systems. Springer International Publishing Switzerland, 2018. – 240 p.
 Sadovnichiy V.A., Zgurovsky M.Z. Modern Mathematics and Mechanics: Fundamentals, Problems and Challenges. Springer International Publishing Switzerland, 2019. – 557 p.
 Zgurovsky M.Z., Pavlov A.A. Combinatorial Optimization Problems in Planning and Decision Making: Theory and Applications. Springer Nature Switzerland, 2019. – 518 p.
 Zgurovsky M.Z., Zaychenko Y.P. Big Data: Conceptual Analysis and Applications. Springer International Publishing Switzerland, 2019. – 277 p.
 Zgurovsky M.Z., Sineglazov V.M., Chumachenko E.I. Artificial Intelligence Systems Based on Hybrid Neural Networks. Springer International Publishing, 2021. – 512 p.
 Sadovnichiy V.A., Zgurovsky M.Z. Contemporary Approaches and Methods in Fundamental Mathematics and Mechanics. Springer International Publishing, 2021. — 522 p.

References

External links
 Mykhailo Zghurovskyi. National Academy of Sciences of Ukraine
 Mykhailo Zakharovych Zghurovskyi (Згуровський Михайло Захарович (1950)). Naukovtsi Ukrainy.

1950 births
Living people
People from Ternopil Oblast
Ukrainian computer scientists
Education and science ministers of Ukraine
Senior Members of the IEEE
Members of the National Academy of Sciences of Ukraine
Recipients of the Order of the Cross of Terra Mariana, 3rd Class
Foreign Members of the Russian Academy of Sciences
Kyiv Polytechnic Institute rectors
Laureates of the State Prize of Ukraine in Science and Technology